Fearless Fred Fury is the fifteenth studio album by American hip hop duo Insane Clown Posse, and their fourth Joker Card in the second Deck of the Dark Carnival Saga. Originally planned for release simultaneously with their twelve-track extended play titled Flip the Rat on October 26, 2018 via Psychopathic Records, it was delayed until February 15, 2019.

Background
During the April 13, 2017 Juggalo Show radio show, Violent J announced that he had "received" the name, face and backstory for the new joker card via an "email in his brain". He went on to say "Before we go out on The Parental Advisory Tour with 2 Live Crew, Onyx and Necro which will run from June until the Gathering of the Juggalos, we will get the skeleton formed. After the GOTJ, Shaggy 2 Dope will go out on the F.T.F.O.M.F. Tour, and when he get back we will begin putting the nervous system, muscles, and skin to the new entity, and bring life to the beast. I won't speak much on it right now, but the only thing I will say is 'Red Fred! Red Fred!'". During the 24th Annual: Hallowicked Show in Detroit, Michigan, the name and face for the new Joker Card was revealed.

On June 22, 2018 ICP took to social media during the "Fearless Fred Fury recording sessions" to give live updates. Pictures were shown with ICP and Str8Jaket with their backs to the camera sitting at the computer working on certain songs. Some songs that were named were "WTF!", "Satellite", "Friend Request", "West Vernor Ave.", "Peek-A-Boo", "1967", and "Game Over". It was also said that "story telling songs like "First Day Out" and "Dreams of Grandeur" would be on the album, as FFF would feature more story telling songs on it than any previous ICP release to date". During ICP's 2018 GOTJ seminar it was announced that FFF would be released on October 26, 2018 plus a bonus album titled Flip the Rat EP would subsequently be released on the same day, with people who only purchase the physical copy could find out how to obtain the EP. Flip the Rat is said to be longer than a standard EP, but shorter than a standard LP, and is being dubbed as an "MP" for "Medium Playlist".

On January 28, 2019 the tracklist was revealed via video easter eggs containing the number for a phone to call revealing a website to visit.

Singles
On November 23, 2018, the first single, "WTF!", was released. On January 7, 2019, it was announced that the track, "Fury", would be released as a single on January 11, 2019.

Track listing

Charts

References

External links

2019 albums
Insane Clown Posse albums
Psychopathic Records albums
Albums produced by Seven (record producer)